The 1868 United States presidential election in Delaware took place on November 3, 1868, as part of the 1868 United States presidential election. Voters chose three representatives, or electors to the Electoral College, who voted for president and vice president.

Delaware voted for the Democratic nominee, Horatio Seymour, over the Republican nominee, Ulysses S. Grant. Seymour won the state by a margin of 18%.

With 59% of the popular vote, Delaware would prove to be Seymour's fifth strongest state in terms of popular vote percentage after Kentucky, Louisiana, Maryland and Georgia.

Results

See also
 United States presidential elections in Delaware

References

Delaware
1868
1868 Delaware elections